Java Soulnation was a music festival concept offering youth-characterized music (R&B, hip hop, rap and soul) in Jakarta, Indonesia. It was announced in 2014 that the festival was merged with Java Rockin'land into Java Soundsfair.

2008
The first Java Soulnation was held at Istora Senayan, Jakarta, Indonesia on 17 and 18 October 2008.
Line-Up

2009
The second edition was held at Istora Senayan for the second time and it was held on 30 & 31 October 2009. It was supported by national GSM mobile operator, Axis.
Line-Up

2010
The third edition was held at Istora Senayan, Jakarta, Indonesia and it was on 29 and 30 October 2010.

Line-Up

2011
The fourth edition was held at Istora Senayan, and it was held for three days for the first time, 23, 24 and 25 September 2011. It was supported by L.A. Lights.
Line-Up

2012
The 2012 Java Soul Nation took place at Istora Senayan on 28, 29 and 30 September 2012. Once again, the event was supported by L.A. Lights.
Line-Up

2013
The last edition of Java Soulnation took place at Istora Senayan on 4, 5 and 6 October 2013.
Line-Up

References

Music festivals in Indonesia
Annual events in Indonesia
Music festivals established in 2008
Hip hop music festivals